Betta falx is a species of betta endemic to the island of Sumatra in Indonesia. It is an inhabitant of acidic, nearly stagnant water, where it can be found amongst the vegetation along the banks.

References

falx
Taxa named by Heok Hui Tan
Taxa named by Maurice Kottelat
Fish described in 1998